Demi Gene Moore (née Guynes; born November 11, 1962) is an American actress. After making her film debut in 1981, Moore appeared on the soap opera General Hospital (1982–1984) and subsequently gained recognition as a member of the Brat Pack with roles in Blame It on Rio (1984), St. Elmo's Fire (1985), and About Last Night... (1986). She had her breakthrough for her starring role in Ghost (1990), the highest-grossing film of that year. Her performance was praised and earned her a Golden Globe nomination. 

She had further box-office success in the early 1990s, with the films A Few Good Men (1992), Indecent Proposal (1993), and Disclosure (1994). In 1996, Moore became the highest-paid actress in film history when she received an unprecedented $12.5 million to star in Striptease. She had starring roles in the films The Scarlet Letter (1995), The Juror (1996) and G.I. Jane (1997), all of which were commercially unsuccessful and contributed to a downturn in her career. Her career has since had a resurgence with supporting roles in such films as The Hunchback of Notre Dame (1996), The Hunchback of Notre Dame II (2002), Charlie's Angels: Full Throttle (2003), Bobby (2006), Mr. Brooks (2007), Margin Call (2011), and Rough Night (2017).

In 2019, she released a memoir titled Inside Out, which became a New York Times Best Seller. Moore has been married three times, to the musician Freddy Moore and the actors Bruce Willis and Ashton Kutcher. She has three daughters with Willis.

Early life

Childhood and family 
Moore was born November 11, 1962, in Roswell, New Mexico. Her biological father, Air Force airman Charles Harmon Sr., left her then 18-year-old mother, Virginia (née King), after a two-month marriage before Moore was born. When Moore was three months old, her mother married Dan Guynes, a newspaper advertising salesman who frequently changed jobs; as a result, the family moved many times. Together, they had Moore's half-brother Morgan. Moore said in 1991, "My dad is Dan Guynes. He raised me. There is a man who would be considered my biological father who I don't really have a relationship with." Moore has half-siblings from Charlie Harmon's other marriages, but she doesn't keep in touch with them either.

Moore's stepfather Dan Guynes divorced and remarried her mother twice. On October 20, 1980, a year after their second divorce from each other, Guynes died by suicide. Her biological father Charlie Harmon died in 1997 from liver cancer. Moore's mother had a long arrest record which included drunk driving and arson. Moore broke off contact with her in 1989, when Guynes walked away halfway through a rehab stay Moore had financed at the Hazelden Foundation in Minnesota. Virginia Guynes posed nude for the magazine High Society in 1993, where she spoofed Moore's Vanity Fair pregnancy and bodypaint covers and parodied her love scene from the film Ghost. Moore and Guynes briefly reconciled shortly before Guynes died of a brain tumor on July 2, 1998.

Moore spent her early childhood in New Mexico, and later, Canonsburg, Pennsylvania. She suffered from strabismus as a child, which was corrected by two operations; Moore also suffered from kidney dysfunction. Moore learned of her biological father, Harmon, at age 13, when she found her mother and stepfather's marriage certificate and inquired about the circumstances since she "saw my parents were married in February 1963. I was born in '62."

Education 
At age 14, Moore returned to her hometown of Roswell and lived with her grandmother for six months before relocating to Washington state, where her mother and siblings were residing near Seattle. Several months later, the family moved again to West Hollywood, California, where Moore's mother took a job working for a magazine distribution company. Moore attended Fairfax High School there, and recalled, "I moved out of my family's house when I was 16 and left high school in my junior year." In 2019, she stated she was raped at 15 by landlord Basil Doumas, then 49. Doumas claimed he had paid Moore's mother to get access to Moore to rape her, although Moore said it is unclear if this were true.

Career

1980–1985: Early roles and breakthrough 
Moore signed with the Elite Modeling Agency, then enrolled in drama classes after being inspired by her next-door neighbor, 17-year-old German actress Nastassja Kinski. In August 1979, at age 16, Moore met musician Freddy Moore who was married and at the time leader of the band Boy, at the Los Angeles nightclub The Troubadour. They lived in an apartment in West Hollywood. Moore co-wrote three songs with Freddy Moore and appeared in the music video for their selection "It's Not a Rumor," performed by his band, The Nu Kats. She continues to receive royalty checks from her songwriting work (1980–81). Moore also sang in the films One Crazy Summer and Bobby.

Moore appeared on the cover of the January 1981 issue of the adult magazine Oui, taken from a photo session in which she had posed nude. In a 1988 interview, Moore claimed she "only posed for the cover of Oui—I was 16; I told them I was 18". Interviewer Alan Carter said, "However, some peekaboo shots did appear inside. And later, nude shots of her turned up in Celebrity Sleuth—photos that she once said 'were for a European fashion magazine'." In 1990, she told another interviewer, "I was 17 years old. I was underage. It was just the cover." Moore made her film debut with a brief role in the 1981 teen drama Choices, directed by Silvio Narizzano. Her second film feature was the 3-D sci-fi horror film Parasite (1982), for which director Charles Band had instructed casting director Johanna Ray to "find me the next Karen Allen." Moore then joined the cast of the ABC soap opera General Hospital, playing the role of an investigative reporter until 1983. During her tenure on the series, she made an uncredited cameo appearance in the 1982 spoof film Young Doctors in Love. Moore's film career took off in 1984 following her appearance in the sex comedy Blame It on Rio. She also portrayed Laura Victor in the comedy film No Small Affair (1984), opposite Jon Cryer.

Moore's commercial breakthrough came in Joel Schumacher's yuppie drama St. Elmo's Fire (1985), which received negative reviews, but was a box office success and brought Moore recognition. Because of her association with that film, Moore was often listed as part of the Brat Pack, a label she felt was "demeaning".  Moore progressed to more serious material with About Last Night... (1986), co-starring Rob Lowe, which marked a positive turning point in her career, as Moore noted that, following its release, she began seeing better scripts. Film critic Roger Ebert gave the film four out of four stars and praised her performance, writing, "There isn't a romantic note she isn't required to play in this movie, and she plays them all flawlessly."

1986–1996: Breakthrough and critical success 

The success of About Last Night... was unrivaled by Moore's other two 1986 releases, One Crazy Summer and Wisdom, the last youth-oriented films in which she would star. Moore was listed as one of twelve "Promising New Actors of 1986" in John Willis's Screen World, Vol. 38. Moore made her professional stage debut in an off-Broadway production of The Early Girl, which ran at the Circle Repertory Company in fall 1986. In 1988, Moore starred as a prophecy-bearing mother in the apocalyptic drama The Seventh Sign—her first outing as a solo film star— and in 1989, she played the quick-witted local laundress and prostitute in Neil Jordan's Depression-era allegory We're No Angels, opposite Robert De Niro.

Moore's most successful film to date is the supernatural romantic melodrama Ghost (1990), which grossed over US$505 million at the box office and was the highest-grossing film of the year. She played a young woman in jeopardy to be protected by the ghost of her murdered lover. The love scene between Moore and Patrick Swayze that starts in front of a potter's wheel to the sound of "Unchained Melody" has become an iconic moment in cinema history. Ghost was nominated for the Academy Award for Best Picture, and Moore's performance earned her a Golden Globe Award nomination. In 1991 Moore starred in the horror comedy Nothing but Trouble, co-produced and appeared in the mystery thriller Mortal Thoughts, and played a blonde for the first time in the romantic comedy The Butcher's Wife, with Roger Ebert's review describing her as "warm and cuddly". Moore sustained her A-list status with her starring roles in Rob Reiner's A Few Good Men (1992), Adrian Lyne's Indecent Proposal (1993), and Barry Levinson's Disclosure (1994)—all of which opened at No. 1 at the box office and were blockbuster hits.

By 1995 Moore was the highest paid actress in Hollywood. Her portrayal of Hester Prynne in The Scarlet Letter (1995), a "freely adapted" version of the historical romance novel by Nathaniel Hawthorne, was met with harsh criticism. The coming-of-age drama Now and Then (1995) found moderate box office success. Moore was paid a record-breaking salary of US$12.5 million in 1996 to star in Striptease. Much hype was made about Moore's willingness to dance topless for the part, though this was the sixth time she had shown her breasts on film. The film opened to overwhelmingly negative reviews with Moore's performance being criticised. It was a moderate financial success, grossing US$113 million worldwide, and Moore received the Golden Raspberry Award for Worst Actress. Moore starred in the thriller The Juror (1996). It was a box office bomb and was heavily panned by critics.

Moore produced and starred in a controversial miniseries for HBO called If These Walls Could Talk (1996), a three-part anthology about abortion alongside Sissy Spacek and Cher. Its screenwriter, Nancy Savoca, directed two segments, including one in which Moore played a widowed nurse in the early 1950s seeking a back-alley abortion. For that role, Moore received a second Golden Globe nomination as Best Actress. Also in 1996, she provided the speaking voice of the beautiful Esmeralda in Disney's animated adaptation of The Hunchback of Notre Dame, and starred in Mike Judge's comedy Beavis and Butt-head Do America, alongside her then husband Bruce Willis. Moore shaved her head to play the first woman to undergo training in the Navy SEALs in Ridley Scott's G.I. Jane (1997). Budgeted at US$50 million, the film was a moderate commercial success, with a worldwide gross of US$97.1 million.

1997–2003: Career downturn and other ventures 

During the production of G.I. Jane, it was reported that Moore had ordered studio chiefs to charter two planes for her entourage and her, which reinforced her negative reputation for being a diva—she had previously turned down the Sandra Bullock role in While You Were Sleeping because the studio refused to meet her salary demands, and was dubbed "Gimme Moore" by the media. Moore took on the role of an ultrapious psychiatrist in Woody Allen's Deconstructing Harry, also in 1997.

After G.I. Jane, Moore retreated from the spotlight and moved to Hailey, Idaho, on a full-time basis to devote herself to raising her three daughters. Moore was off screen for three years before re-emerging in the arthouse psychological drama Passion of Mind (2000), the first English-language film from Belgian director Alain Berliner. Her performance as a woman with dissociative identity disorder was well received, but the film itself garnered mixed reviews and was deemed "naggingly slow" by some critics. Moore then resumed her self-imposed career hiatus and continued to turn down film offers. Producer Irwin Winkler said in 2001, "I had a project about a year and a half ago, and we made an inquiry about her—a real good commercial picture. She wasn't interested."

Moore returned to the screen playing a villain in the 2003 film Charlie's Angels: Full Throttle, opposite Cameron Diaz, Drew Barrymore and Lucy Liu. A commercial success, the film made US$259.1 million worldwide, and Rolling Stone, on Moore's role, remarked: "It's a relief when Demi Moore shows up as fallen angel [...]  Moore, 40, looks great in a bikini and doesn't even try to act. Her unsmiling sexiness cuts through the gigglefest as the angels fight, kick, dance and motocross like Indiana Jones clones on estrogen". Charlie's Angels: Full Throttle was followed by yet another three-year absence. In the interim, Moore signed on as the face of the Versace fashion brand and the Helena Rubinstein brand of cosmetics.

2006–2011: Comeback and resurgence 
In Emilio Estevez's drama Bobby (2006), Moore portrayed an alcoholic singer whose career is on the downswing, as part of an ensemble cast, about the hours leading up to the Robert F. Kennedy assassination. As a member of the cast, she was nominated for the Screen Actors Guild Award for Best Cast in a Motion Picture. The film won the Hollywood Film Festival Award for Best Ensemble Cast. Moore had a lead role as grieving and tormented novelist in the mystery thriller Half Light (2006) alongside Hans Matheson, then took on the role of a driven police officer investigating a serial killer in the psychological thriller Mr. Brooks (2007), with Kevin Costner. The film received mixed reviews and grossed $48.1 million worldwide. Rolling Stone wrote that "the cop on the case, played by Demi Moore with a striking directness that deserved better than being saddled with an absurd back story as an heiress with a fortune-hunting husband."

Moore reunited with Blame It on Rio co-star Michael Caine for the British crime drama film Flawless (2008), which saw her portray an American executive helping to steal a handful of diamonds from the London Diamond Corporation during the 1960s. Moore received positive reviews from critics; Miami Herald wrote: "The inspired pairing of Demi Moore and Michael Caine as a pair of thieves in the diamond-heist semi-caper movie Flawless goes a long way toward overcoming the film's slack, leisurely pacing".

In 2010, Moore took on the role of a daughter helping her father deal with age-related health problems in the dramedy Happy Tears, opposite Parker Posey and Rip Torn, and starred as the matriarch of a family moving into a suburban neighborhood in the comedy The Joneses, with David Duchovny. The latter film was largely highlighted upon its theatrical release, with critics concluding that it "benefits from its timely satire of consumer culture — as well as a pair of strong performances" from Duchovny and Moore. In Bunraku (2010), a film Moore described as a "big action adventure," she played a courtesan and a femme fatale with a secret past.

Moore portrayed a chief risk management officer at a large Wall Street investment bank during the initial stages of the financial crisis of 2007–08 in the critically acclaimed corporate drama Margin Call (2011), where she was part of an ensemble cast that included Kevin Spacey, Simon Baker, and Paul Bettany. The cast garnered nominations for the "Best Ensemble" award from the Gotham Awards, the Phoenix Film Critics Society and the Central Ohio Film Critics Association. Also in 2011, Moore received a Directors Guild of America Award nomination for Outstanding Directing – Miniseries or TV Film for her work as a director in a segment of the 2011 Lifetime anthology film Five, and starred opposite Ellen Barkin, Ellen Burstyn and George Kennedy in Sam Levinson's black comedy Another Happy Day, which premiered at the Sundance Film Festival.

2012–present: memoir and television roles 
Moore appeared as the mother of Miley Cyrus' character in the romantic drama film LOL (2012). She played a similar mother role in her next film, the likewise coming-of-age dramedy Very Good Girls (2013), which co-starred Dakota Fanning and Elizabeth Olsen. Her part as an old flame of a quick-draw killer in the Western drama Forsaken (2015), with Donald Sutherland and Kiefer Sutherland, was followed by the role of the daughter of a retired high school teacher in the road comedy Wild Oats, which premiered on Lifetime in August 2016, and in a limited release the following month. In her next film, the drama Blind (2017), Moore starred opposite Alec Baldwin, portraying the neglected wife of an indicted businessman having an affair with a novelist blinded in a car crash.

In February 2017, Moore joined the cast of Empire, in the recurring role of a take-charge nurse with a mysterious past. The comedy film Rough Night (2017)  featured Moore as one half of a nymphomaniac couple seducing a member of a bachelorette party gone wrong. The film was released in the United States on June 16, 2017, by Columbia Pictures, received mixed reviews and grossed $47 million worldwide. She played Selma in the Indian drama film Love Sonia (2018), which tells the story of a young girl's journey to rescue her sister from the dangerous world of international sex trafficking. She portrayed Lucy, a superficial CEO in the comedy horror film Corporate Animals (2019), which premiered at the Sundance Film Festival on January 29, 2019.

Moore's memoir, Inside Out, was published on September 24, 2019, by HarperCollins. On October 13, 2019, the book debuted at number one on The New York Times' Combined Print & E-Book Nonfiction best-sellers list and the Hardcover Nonfiction best-sellers list. Moore discussed the book in an exclusive interview with Diane Sawyer of ABC News on Good Morning America. Moore and her two daughters Rumer and Tallulah appeared on Jada Pinkett Smith's web television talk show Red Table Talk on November 4, 2019.

On June 24, 2020, Moore joined as Piper Griffin, the matriarch of a powerful family "who will stop at nothing to protect her family and her way of life" in the pandemic-themed thriller produced by Michael Bay, Songbird, alongside Craig Robinson, Paul Walter Hauser and Peter Stormare. Moore has a leading role as Diana in Amazon's drama series, Dirty Diana, which is based on the podcast of the same name. The podcast is voiced by Moore and she also serves as producer with screenwriter Shana Feste. Moore was among the celebrities who made cameo appearances modeling lingerie at Rihanna's Savage x Fenty Vol. 2 fashion show in 2020.

Media image

Status and persona 

Moore is viewed as a pioneer for equal salary for women in Hollywood. She was paid $12.5 million for her role in Striptease, which was more money than any other woman in Hollywood had ever been offered at the time. Producers for Striptease and G.I. Jane got into a bidding war to see who could get Moore to film first. Striptease won and Moore became the highest paid actress in Hollywood in 1995. "She became a pioneer for other actresses by being the first female lead to demand the same salary, benefits and billing as her male counterparts," Lifetime wrote. "Her screen persona always has something indestructible about it. There's a toughness, a strength, a determination," The Guardian described in 2007.

Moore has been included in magazine lists of the world's most beautiful women. She was selected as one of People magazine's 50 Most Beautiful People in the world in 1996. In 2004, People ranked her ninth on their list of All-Time Most Beautiful Women. She was voted seventh on Life & Style magazine's Best Dressed Female poll in December 2006. In 1999, she was ranked eighth on Forbes' list of Top 20 Actresses, based on three separate lists of box office receipts. In 1999, Moore became a guest editor for the November issue of Marie Claire.  On December 31, 2019, The Wall Street Journal listed a cover story about Moore as one of their most-read stories in 2019.

Moore has 4.5 million followers on Twitter as of January 2020. She uses Twitter as a platform to raise awareness of sexual trafficking and slavery. "She is practicing what she preaches: More than half of her posts are on the subject, directing followers where to get involved," Harper's Bazaar reported in August 2010. "I like to connect to people in the virtual world.. exchanging thoughts and ideas, when in the physical world we might never have the opportunity to cross paths," Moore told Harper's Bazaar.

Moore has graced the cover of numerous international fashion magazines, including France's Elle; UK's Grazia; US' W, Vanity Fair, Interview, Rolling Stone, Glamour and InStyle; Australia's Harper's Bazaar and Turkey's Marie Claire. She has also appeared on the front cover of Vogue (Portugal, France and US). Moore has appeared in commercials and print ads throughout her career. She has appeared in television commercials for Keds, Oscar Mayer, Diet Coke, Lux, Jog Mate and Seibu Department Stores, and print ads for Versace and Ann Taylor.

Vanity Fair controversy

In August 1991, Moore appeared nude on the cover of Vanity Fair under the title More Demi Moore. Annie Leibovitz shot the picture while Moore was seven months pregnant with the second of her three daughters, Scout LaRue Willis, intending to portray "anti-Hollywood, anti-glitz" attitude. The cover drew a lot of attention, being discussed on television, radio, and in newspaper articles. The frankness of Leibovitz's portrayal of a pregnant sex symbol led to divided opinions, ranging from suggestions of sexual objectification to celebrations of the photograph as a symbol of empowerment.

The photograph was subject to numerous parodies, including the Spy Magazine version, which placed Moore's then-husband Bruce Willis's head on her body. In Leibovitz v. Paramount Pictures Corp., Leibovitz sued over one parody featuring Leslie Nielsen, made to promote the 1994 film Naked Gun : The Final Insult. In the parody, the model's body was attached to what is described as "the guilty and smirking face" of Nielsen. The teaser said "Due this March." The case was dismissed in 1996 because the parody relied "for its comic effect on the contrast between the original." In November 2009, the Moroccan magazine Femmes du Maroc emulated the pose with Moroccan news reporter Nadia Larguet, causing controversy in the majority-Muslim nation.

In August 1992, Moore again appeared nude on the cover of Vanity Fair, this time modeling for body painting artist Joanne Gair in Demi's Birthday Suit. In October 2019, she posed nude on the cover of Harper's Bazaar.

Activism and philanthropy

Moore has supported numerous charities, including All Day Foundation, American Foundation for AIDS Research, Artists for Peace and Justice, Coalition to Abolish Slavery and Trafficking, Declare Yourself, Free The Slaves, Healthy Child Healthy World, Raising Malawi, The Art of Elysium and UNICEF. In 2010, Moore defeated Kevin Bacon to win $250,000 in the Pepsi Refresh Celebrity Challenge. She chose to support the organization GEMS: Girls Educational & Mentoring Services, a nonprofit group which aims to empower young women who have been the victims of commercial sexual exploitation and trafficking. She traveled to Haiti with the Artists for Peace and Justice following the earthquake of 2010. She has also supported Chrysalis, a non-profit organization which offers employment opportunities to the homeless.

Moore became a special contributor to the CNN Freedom Project and traveled to Nepal to meet with 2010 CNN Hero of the Year Anuradha Koirala and her organization, Maiti Nepal, which has rescued more than 12,000 stolen Nepalese children from sex trafficking since 1993. Moore was the narrator and anchor of CNN's documentary on child trafficking, called Nepal's Stolen Children, which aired on June 26, 2011. In the documentary, Moore talked to Nepal's prime minister, Jhalanath Khanal, and young girls who were forced into prostitution before being saved by a Nepalese nonprofit.

In 2009, Moore and Kutcher launched DNA Foundation, a nonprofit, non-governmental organization directed towards fighting child sexual slavery. The foundation's first campaign included several celebrities, including Justin Timberlake, Sean Penn, Bradley Cooper appearing in a series of viral videos proclaiming: "Real Men Don't Buy Girls." In November 2012, the foundation said it was announcing "a new name and refined mission" as Thorn: Digital Defenders of Children, which aimed "to disrupt and deflate the predatory behavior of those who abuse and traffic children, solicit sex with children or create and share child pornography". Thorn: Digital Defenders of Children, assisted law enforcement in identifying 5,894 child sex trafficking victims and rescuing 103 children from "situations where their sexual abuse was recorded and distributed" in 2017, according to the organization's 2017 impact report. In 2018, Los Angeles-based nonprofit organization, Visionary Women honored Moore with its inaugural Visionary Woman Award for her work to combat human trafficking.

Personal life

Marriages and relationships

On February 8, 1981, at the age of 18, Moore married singer Freddy Moore, 12 years her senior and recently divorced from his first wife, Lucy. Before their marriage, Demi began using Freddy's surname as her stage name. The pair separated in 1983, after which Demi had a relationship with Timothy Hutton. She filed for divorce from Moore in September 1984; it was finalized on August 7, 1985. Moore was then engaged to actor Emilio Estevez, with whom she co-starred in St. Elmo's Fire and Wisdom, a crime drama he also wrote and directed. The pair planned to marry in December 1986, but called off the engagement.

On November 21, 1987, Moore married her second husband, actor Bruce Willis. She and Willis have three daughters together: Rumer Glenn Willis (born August 16, 1988), Scout LaRue Willis (born July 20, 1991), and Tallulah Belle Willis (born February 3, 1994). They announced their separation on June 24, 1998, and filed for divorce on October 18, 2000. Moore had a three-year relationship with martial arts instructor Oliver Whitcomb, whom she dated from 1999 to 2002.

In 2003, Moore began dating actor Ashton Kutcher, who is 15 years her junior. Soon after they began dating, Moore became pregnant at the age of 42, and she suffered a miscarriage six months into the pregnancy. They married on September 24, 2005. The wedding was attended by about 150 close friends and family of the couple, including Willis. In November 2011, after months of media speculation about the state of the couple's marriage, Moore announced her decision to end her marriage to Kutcher. After over a year of separation, Kutcher filed for divorce from Moore on December 21, 2012, in Los Angeles Superior Court, citing irreconcilable differences. Moore filed her response papers in March 2013, requesting spousal support and payment of legal fees from Kutcher. On November 26, 2013, their divorce was finalized.

Interests
She was at one point a follower of Philip Berg's Kabbalah Centre religion, and initiated Kutcher into the faith, having said that she "didn't grow up Jewish, but [...] would say that [she has] been more exposed to the deeper meanings of particular rituals than any of [her] friends that did." She is no longer affiliated with Berg's organization.

According to The New York Times, Moore is "the world's most high-profile doll collector", and among her favorites is the Gene Marshall fashion doll. At one point, Moore kept a separate residence to house her 2,000 dolls.

She appeared on PETA's Worst-Dressed List in 2009 for wearing fur; two years later she supported the group's efforts to ban circus workers' use of bullhooks on elephants.

Filmography

Bibliography

Awards and nominations 
Moore is the recipient of many accolades, including nominations for a Critics' Choice Award, two Golden Globe Awards, a Primetime Emmy Award and a Screen Actors Guild Award.

Notes

References

External links

 
 Demi Moore interview by KVUE in 1986 discussing About Last Night from Texas Archive of the Moving Image
 
 
 Thorn (formerly the Demi and Ashton Foundation)
 

1962 births
20th-century American actresses
21st-century American actresses
American film actresses
American film producers
American voice actresses
Actresses from Hollywood, Los Angeles
Actresses from Idaho
Actresses from New Mexico
Actresses from Pennsylvania
American soap opera actresses
American women film producers
American television actresses
Fairfax High School (Los Angeles) alumni
Female models from Idaho
Female models from New Mexico
Living people
People from Fayette County, Pennsylvania
People from Hailey, Idaho
People from Roswell, New Mexico
Disney people